One of Us Tripped is a 1997 American drama film directed by Tim Story (in his directorial debut) starring Kimani Callender and Kevin Mambo.

Plot
Some children in Los Angeles are drawn into a mystery.

Cast
 Kimani Callender as Felix
 Kevin Mambo as Thomas
 Regina Williams
 Damon Wilson as Miles
 Nakia Burrise as Keisha

References

External links
 
 

American crime drama films
Films directed by Tim Story
1997 films
Hood films
1997 crime drama films
1997 directorial debut films
1990s English-language films
1990s American films